Lisa McCune (born 19 February 1971) is an Australian actress, known for her role in TV series Blue Heelers as Senior Constable Maggie Doyle, and  in Sea Patrol as Lieutenant Kate McGregor RAN. She has won four Gold Logie Awards.

McCune has also featured in many theatre roles.

Early career (1986–1993)

Born in Sydney, McCune grew up in Perth. She first performed on stage at the age of 15 playing Dorothy in The Wizard of Oz at the Limelight Theatre in Wanneroo, Western Australia.

After attending Carine Senior High School and graduating from Greenwood Senior High School, she was accepted into both the classical singing and musical theatre courses at the Western Australian Academy of Performing Arts (WAAPA). She graduated with a BA in Music Theatre in 1990. Upon graduation, McCune secured an agent, Robyn Gardiner Management (RGM Associates), and took on various jobs in Sydney and Melbourne.

In February 1991, she won a twelve-month contract with Coles Supermarkets for a series of print and TV advertisements in which she played Lisa, the girl-next-door checkout chick.

McCune performed in a statewide tour of Victorian high schools in the educational John Romeril play about work experience, called Working Out, was in the chorus for a Sydney musical version of Great Expectations starring Philip Gould, and starred as the aspiring ballerina postulant, Sister Mary Leo, in the sequel to the Dan Goggin musical Nunsense.

She had a brief appearance in a re-enactment about a possible UFO-sighting in Bass Strait for the American series Unsolved Mysteries and a role in the 1993 satirical horror movie Body Melt in which her heavily pregnant character was attacked by a ferocious placenta before dying from an exploding stomach. McCune also sang in a couple of bands, including George Kapiniaris' Flares and Choice.

In 1991, she filmed a pilot for a Steve Vizard/Artist Services comedy called Turn it Up (aka Radio Waves). In 1993, McCune won the lead part of Allie Carter in the pilot of Newlyweds before being replaced by Annie Jones for the series.

Blue Heelers (1993–2000)

McCune shot to fame in September 1993 at age 22 when she debuted as Constable Maggie Doyle in Blue Heelers, playing the role until the seventh season. During this time she won the Gold Logie Award for Most Popular Television Personality four times.

Throughout her Blue Heelers run, she occasionally took time off to appear in other productions. In 1996 McCune appeared opposite Brett Climo who played her brother in Blue Heelers, in a friend's film The Inner Sanctuary. In early 1997 she played the role of Anne in the Melbourne Theatre Company's (MTC) production of Sondheim's A Little Night Music. In 1998, McCune played Cinderella in another Sondheim musical, Into the Woods. She also did two short seasons of the classic two-hander Love Letters.

In early 1999 she took six weeks off Blue Heelers to play one of the leads, Mary Abacus, in the miniseries adaptation of Bryce Courtenay's The Potato Factory, which earned her a nomination for an AFI award for Best Actress in a TV Drama. In July 1999, a couple of months before finishing on Blue Heelers, she starred alongside John Wood in She Loves Me.

Later career (2000–present)

Immediately after finishing Blue Heelers, she starred alongside John Waters, Bert Newton, Nikki Webster, Rachel Marley and later Rob Guest in a stage version of The Sound of Music, as Maria von Trapp.

In 2001, while she was pregnant with her first child, her portrait by Shaun Clark was entered in the Archibald Prize. She was off screens for a year to be a stay-at-home mother.

In 2002, her next project was a "comeback" role in the television series Marshall Law with Alison Whyte and former Blue Heelers cast member William McInnes. Although it rated well in the first week, the series was critically panned and its subsequent low ratings ensured it was cancelled after one season.

In 2004, after another year off due to the birth to her second child, McCune slowly began to return to television. She again was the advertising face of Coles Supermarkets. She also hosted Seven Network shows The World Around Us and Forensic Investigators. McCune also appeared as the love interest opposite Matt Day in the ABC telemovie Hell Has Harbour Views.

In September 2005, McCune guest starred in a four-episode storyline on MDA alongside her former Blue Heelers co-star Paul Bishop. Also in 2005 she narrated a second season of Forensic Investigators and appeared in the Australian film Little Fish, starring alongside Cate Blanchett and Sam Neill in the early stages of her third pregnancy. In 2006, she played Annabel in Tripping Over.

She has also appeared in a number of musicals and other stage productions around Australia, notably as Sally Bowles in Cabaret, Hope Cladwell in Urinetown, and Olive Ostrovsky in The 25th Annual Putnam County Spelling Bee. In 2012/13, she performed opposite Teddy Tahu Rhodes in Opera Australia's production of the Bartlett Sher 2008 New York revival of the Rodgers and Hammerstein musical South Pacific at the Sydney Opera House, the Princess Theatre, Melbourne, and the Brisbane Queensland Performing Arts Centre.

From 2007 until 2011, McCune was in the ensemble cast for the Nine Network drama series, Sea Patrol. Her character is the executive officer (second in command) Lieutenant Kate McGregor, of HMAS Hammersley, a fictional Royal Australian Navy patrol boat. There were five seasons of the show, and it was cancelled due to financial issues resulting from the scheduled loss of pertinent government tax credits.

On 5 April 2008, she began her role of Sarah Brown in the major stage production Guys and Dolls, playing for 20 weeks at the Princess Theatre in Melbourne before being revived for a Sydney season at the Capitol Theatre on 12 March 2009.

In 2010, she appeared as Jean in the MTC production of Sarah Ruhl's Dead Man's Cell Phone. McCune also appeared as the celebrity guest in the reasonably-priced ute/car in season 3, episode 1 of Top Gear Australia in August. She appeared alongside Richard Roxburgh in season 1, episode 2 of the television series Rake, which aired in November.

McCune starred Dr. Sam Stewart in Reef Doctors, an Australian television drama series that ran 9 June 2013 to 7 September 2013.

In 2014, she starred as Anna Leonowens in Opera Australia's production of the Rodgers and Hammerstein musical The King and I, playing opposite Teddy Tahu Rhodes in Brisbane and Sydney, and Lou Diamond Phillips in Melbourne.

In 2015, McCune recorded "The Unbearable Price of War", a duet with Lee Kernaghan for his album Spirit of the Anzacs. Later that year, she joined David Hobson, Teddy Tahu Rhodes, and Greta Bradman for a concert tour, From Broadway to La Scala, of the five Australian mainland state capitals.

In 2018, she appeared in the Network Ten comedy How to Stay Married with Peter Helliar. In 2019, McCune appeared in 33 Variations at the Comedy Theatre, Melbourne, opposite Ellen Burstyn. McCune played Gertrude in Bell Shakespeare's 2020 production of Hamlet at the Sydney Opera House, the Canberra Theatre Centre and the Arts Centre Melbourne. In 2022, she appeared as Elizabeth Laine in Girl from the North Country at the Sydney Festival, and then in Adelaide and Melbourne.

Personal life

McCune married Tim Disney, a film technician who was part of the Blue Heelers crew, on 18 February 2000. They have three children, born in 2001, 2003 and 2005. McCune confirmed in 2020 that Disney was her ex-husband but they continue to co-habitate and co-parent. In 2021, McCune said she was "happily single", in an interview with Australian Women's Weekly.

Filmography

Awards and nominations

References

External links

1971 births
Living people
Actresses from Perth, Western Australia
People educated at Carine Senior High School
Western Australian Academy of Performing Arts alumni
Australian film actresses
Australian television actresses
Australian musical theatre actresses
Australian Shakespearean actresses
Actresses from Western Australia
20th-century Australian actresses
21st-century Australian actresses
Gold Logie winners